The siege of Dyneburg by the Russian Army under Tsar Alexei Mikhailovich was one of the first events of the Russo-Swedish War (1656–1658), a theater of the Second Northern War. 

The siege began on 18 July 1656. One night in early August, the Russian bombardment caused a fire in the grain reserves of the stronghold. Consequently, some of the garrison had to leave the defences to begin putting it down. The Russians took advantage by immediately storming the fortifications and after a two hour fight, secured a victory. The commandant of the fort, Johan Willichman, took the Swedish flag with him and jumped into the fire. Rest of the defenders as well as all males present in the stronghold were slaughtered. 

After capturing Dyneburg (Dünaburg, Daugavpils), Tsar Alexei Mikhailovich ordered the building of an Eastern Orthodox Church and the renaming of the city as Borisoglebsk. The capture of Dynaburg was followed by the capture of Kokenhusen.

References

Bibliography 
 Николай Шефов. Битвы России. Военно-историческая библиотека. М., 2002

Second Northern War
Sieges involving Russia
Sieges involving Sweden
Conflicts in 1656
1656 in Europe
History of Daugavpils
Russians in Latvia